Gavin James Wright (born 15 December 1973) is an English former first-class cricketer.

Wright was born at Holmfirth in December 1973. He later studied at Balliol College at the University of Oxford. While studying at Oxford, he played first-class cricket for Oxford University on four occasions, making one appearance in 1996 and three in 1997. A right-arm medium pace bowler, he took just a single wicket from 55 overs bowled, conceding 279 runs.

After graduating from Oxford with a doctorate in biochemistry, Wright became a molecular biologist.

References

External links

1973 births
Living people
People from Holmfirth
Alumni of Balliol College, Oxford
English cricketers
Oxford University cricketers
English molecular biologists